Carlos Alfredo Salazar Cumana (born 15 May 1989) is a Venezuelan international footballer who plays for Zulia FC, as a central defender.

Career
Salazar has played club football for Carabobo, Aragua and Deportivo Anzoátegui.

He made his international debut for Venezuela in 2009.

References

External links

1989 births
Living people
Venezuelan footballers
Venezuela international footballers
Carabobo F.C. players
Aragua FC players
Deportivo Anzoátegui players
Deportivo Táchira F.C. players
Academia Puerto Cabello players
Estudiantes de Caracas players
Zulia F.C. players
Venezuelan Primera División players
Association football defenders
People from Barcelona, Venezuela
21st-century Venezuelan people